Antonio Greppi (4 February 1722 in Cazzano Sant'Andrea – 22 July 1799 in Santa Vittoria, near Gualtieri), 1st Count of Bussero and Corneliano was an Italian banker, merchant, politician and diplomat, active at the international level in wool and textile manufacture.

External links
http://www.treccani.it/enciclopedia/antonio-greppi_(Dizionario-Biografico)/

1722 births
1799 deaths
18th-century Italian businesspeople